Border Shootout (also known as Law at Randado) is a 1990 Western film starring Glenn Ford as Sheriff John Danaher, who returns to a town to enforce justice.

Cast 
 Glenn Ford as Sheriff John Danaher 
 Michael Ansara as Chuluha
 Michael Forest as Earl Beaudry
 Russell Todd as Clay Jordan
 Michael Horse as Dandy Jim
 Cody Glenn as Kirby Frye
 Charlene Tilton as Edith Hanasain

External links 
 Bowker's Complete Video Directory 2002: Entertainment : titles A-S., Book 1
 
 Trailer for Border Shootout - https://www.youtube.com/watch?v=4piEuEotSKo

1990 films
1990 Western (genre) films
American Western (genre) films
1990s English-language films
Films based on works by Elmore Leonard
1990s American films